Gulbene District was an administrative division of Latvia, located in the Vidzeme region, in the country's north-east. It was organized into a city and thirteen parishes, each with a local government authority. The main city in the district was Gulbene.

In Gulbene, a Baltic single passage narrow-gauge railroad, Gulbene-Aluksne, was renovated and started to operate in 2005.

Gulbene has a basketball team, ASK/Buki-Gulbene.

Districts were eliminated during the administrative-territorial reform in 2009.

Cities and parishes of the Gulbene District

 Beļava Parish
 Dauksti Parish
 Druviena Parish
 Galgauska Parish
 Gulbene city
 Litene Parish 
 Lizums Parish
 Līgo Parish
 Lejasciems Parish
 Jaungulbene Parish
 Stāmeriena Parish
 Ranka Parish
 Stradi Parish
 Tirza Parish

References 

Districts of Latvia